DDP can mean:

Commerce
 Delivered Duty Paid, an international shipping method
 Devil's Due Publishing, a comic book publisher
 Disability and Development Partners, a UK international organisation
 Double Dragon Publishing, a science-fiction and fantasy publisher

Computing
 Data-directed programming, a programming paradigm
 Datagram Delivery Protocol, a networking protocol in the AppleTalk suite
 DDP-316, family of minicomputer systems, including DDP-116, DDP-516, DDP-716.
 Differential dynamic programming, a second-order algorithm for trajectory optimization
 Digital DawgPound, a hacker group
 Disc Description Protocol, a generic disc image file format
 Distributed Data Processing, a 1970s term referring to one of IBM's combined offerings
 Distributed Data Protocol, a client-server protocol for querying and updating a database
 Dolby Digital Plus, a multichannel audio compression technology

Medicine and science
 Deafness dystonia polypeptide, a protein/gene also known as TIMM8A
 DNA Doe Project, a non-profit, volunteer group that identifies John and Jane Does using genetic genealogy techniques
 Dyadic developmental psychotherapy, for children with serious emotional disorders

Politics and government
 Deutsche Demokratische Partei (German Democratic Party), a defunct political party in the German Weimar Republic
 Deputy Director for Plans, former name of the Deputy Director of CIA for Operations
 Direct Democracy Party of New Zealand, a political party

Other uses
 Diamond Dallas Page, professional wrestler
 Disney Dining Plan, a meal package for Walt Disney World hotel guests
 DoDonPachi, a 1997 video game
 Dominicans Don't Play, a New York-based street gang of Latino youths whose heritage is traced to the Dominican Republic
 Dongdaemun Design Plaza, a Seoul landmark
 Dublin Death Patrol, an American thrash metal band
 Dudley Port railway station (station code), in Tipton, England, United Kingdom